Paul Maher (born 11 June 1976) is a former professional Australian rules footballer who played for the Fremantle in the Australian Football League (AFL) and Perth in the West Australian Football League (WAFL).

After having player his junior career with Perth, Maher was the 21st selection in the 1997 AFL rookie draft.

Maher was elevated from the rookie list midway through the 1998 AFL season, but suffered a bad knee injury in his third AFL game, Round 17, 1998 against Adelaide at Subiaco Oval. Maher would play two more AFL games late in 1999 but could not regain his form and was delisted after not playing an AFL game in 2000.  In 2008 and 2009 Maher was the reserves coach at the Perth Football Club in the WAFL.

References

External links

WAFL playing statistics

1976 births
Fremantle Football Club players
Perth Football Club players
Living people
Australian rules footballers from Western Australia